Kimmer Coppejans  (born 7 February 1994) is a Belgian tennis player. His highest ATP singles ranking is world No. 97, achieved in June 2015. Coppejans competes mainly on the  ATP Challenger Tour circuit. He was the Junior Champion at the 2012 French Open, defeating Filip Peliwo of Canada 6–1, 6–4 in the final.

Challenger and Futures finals

Singles: 24 (12–12)

Doubles: 7 (1–6)

Junior Grand Slam finals

Singles: 1 (1 title)

Performance timeline

Singles

External links

 
 

1994 births
Living people
Belgian male tennis players
Sportspeople from Ostend
Flemish sportspeople
French Open junior champions
Grand Slam (tennis) champions in boys' singles
21st-century Belgian people